Thomas Hill Moore was a commissioner of the U.S. Consumer Product Safety Commission, an independent agency of the U.S. federal government. He was first appointed to the commission by President Bill Clinton in 1995 to complete an unexpired term and was reappointed by Clinton to a full seven-year term in 1996. Moore was appointed to a third term by President George W. Bush in 2003. This term expired in 2010. He served an additional year after the expiration of his term, as commissioners are permitted to do until their successors are appointed.

For most of George W. Bush's term, Moore was the lone Democrat on the three-person commission (two seats lacked appropriation by statute until passage of the Consumer Product Safety Improvement Act of 2008). With the July 2006 resignation of Chairman Hal Stratton, Moore became one of only two commissioners. Moore's seat was filled by Marietta S. Robinson.

References

External links
Official CPSC Biography

U.S. Consumer Product Safety Commission personnel
Living people
Year of birth missing (living people)